Amped & Dangerous is the third studio album from the Malaysian rock band Pop Shuvit, released in 2006 by their own record label, Shuvit Management and distributed by EMI Music Malaysia. This is the only band's album not released in Malaysia and it is only available in Japan.

The band’s name in the album cover was stylized as popshuvit.

Track listing

Personnel
 Moots! - vocals
 JD - guitars
 AJ - bass
 Rudy - drums
 DJ Uno - turntables

References

External links
 Amped & Dangerous at AllMusic

2006 albums
Pop Shuvit albums